Larrissa Willcox (born 27 November 1982) is a New Zealand netball player. She played for the West Coast Fever in the 2008 ANZ Championship season, having played for the same team in Australia's Commonwealth Bank Trophy from 2002 to 2007, when the team was known as the Perth Orioles. In 2009, she switched to New Zealand franchise the Canterbury Tactix, and that same year made her debut for the New Zealand national netball team, the Silver Ferns.

On 17 September 2009, she announced she was leaving the Canterbury Tactix and transferring to the Northern Mystics, joining fellow Silver Ferns Maria Tutaia and Joline Henry, who defected from their Waikato Bay of Plenty Magic franchise.

References

External links
Silver Ferns profile: Larrissa Willcox
2008 West Coast Fever team profile
2008 ANZ Championship profile

1982 births
Living people
New Zealand netball players
West Coast Fever players
Mainland Tactix players
Northern Mystics players
ANZ Championship players
Perth Orioles players
New Zealand expatriate netball people in Australia
New Zealand international netball players
New Zealand international Fast5 players